{{DISPLAYTITLE:C2O4}}
The molecular formula C2O4 (molar mass: 88.02 g/mol) may refer to:

 Oxalate (ethanedioate)
 Dioxetanediones: 
 1,2-Dioxetanedione (1,2-dioxetane-3,4-dione)
 1,3-Dioxetanedione (1,3-dioxetane-2,4-dione)